When Satan Lives is a live album by American death metal band Deicide. It was recorded at the House of Blues in Chicago, Illinois in 1998.

Track listing

Personnel
Glen Benton – bass, vocals
Eric Hoffman – guitars
Brian Hoffman – guitars
Steve Asheim – drums

Production
Deicide – production
Steve Remote – recording, engineering
Jim Morris – mixing

References

Deicide (band) live albums
1998 live albums
Roadrunner Records live albums
Albums recorded at the House of Blues